May Brookyn (?1854/59 - February 15, 1894) was an English born American stage actress.

Brookyn was born in Cornwall, England. Her name was spelled Brookyn but is often misspelled Brooklyn.

Brookyn joined a theatrical company at age 15 when her parents were abroad. They made her return to school, but she persisted and resumed acting. Wilson Barrett signed her to act in a production of The Silver King in England. Her American stage debut came in the role of Claire in a production of The Forge Master.

On February 15, 1894 she died by suicide by taking carbolic acid in San Francisco several months after the death of her lover Frederic A. Lovecraft shot himself. Brookyn was born in Greater London, England and is buried in Brooklyn's Evergreen Cemetery.

Selected roles
Jim the Penman as Mrs. Ralston (substitute for Agnes Booth)
The Pharisee
Alabama as Widow Page (1891)
Lady Windermere's Fan as Mrs. Erlynne

References

External links
May Brookyn photo gallery (NY Public Library, Billy Rose collection)

1854 births
1894 deaths
19th-century American actresses
American stage actresses
English stage actresses
Suicides by poison
Actresses from London
English emigrants to the United States
1890s suicides
19th-century English women
19th-century English people